Ethan Alexis Chislett (born 11 August 1998) is a South African professional soccer player who plays as a midfielder for AFC Wimbledon.

Career
Born in Durban, South Africa, Chislett moved to England as a child and joined youth team Guildford Saints before joining the academy at Southampton, where he was released for being too small. He then joined Aldershot Town for two years before joining Metropolitan Police, playing in the under-18s at first before progressing onto the senior team in 2015 aged 17. In October 2016, he briefly joined Basingstoke Town before moving to Spain, where Chislett played for CF Reddis in the Segona Catalana and had a trial at KAS Eupen. 

He returned to England to re-join Met Police for the 2018–19 season, where he was part of the side that won the SFL Premier Division South playoffs before losing to Tonbridge Angels in the one-off super playoff final, in which Chislett scored the opening goal. The following month, he re-joined Aldershot. Chislett scored nine goals in 38 games in all competitions in the curtailed 2019–20 season.

AFC Wimbledon
On 12 August 2020, he signed for AFC Wimbledon. He made his Dons debut in the EFL Trophy against Charlton Athletic on 1 September 2020. He scored his first goal for Wimbledon in a 2-2 draw against Northampton Town on 12 September 2020.

Career statistics

References

1998 births
Living people
South African soccer players
Association football midfielders
Southampton F.C. players
Aldershot Town F.C. players
Metropolitan Police F.C. players
AFC Wimbledon players
National League (English football) players
Isthmian League players
Southern Football League players
South African expatriate soccer players
Expatriate footballers in England
South African expatriate sportspeople in England
Sportspeople from Durban